Themida Christodoulidou (born ) is a Cypriot individual rhythmic gymnast. She represents her nation at international competitions. She competed at world championships, including at the 2014 and 2015 World Rhythmic Gymnastics Championships. At the 2014 Commonwealth Games, she won the bronze medal for the clubs.

References

1997 births
Living people
Cypriot rhythmic gymnasts
Place of birth missing (living people)
Gymnasts at the 2014 Commonwealth Games
Commonwealth Games medallists in gymnastics
Commonwealth Games bronze medallists for Cyprus
People from Nicosia District
Medallists at the 2014 Commonwealth Games